Indre Bråkdalshøe is a mountain in Sel Municipality in Innlandet county, Norway. The mountain is surrounded by several other notable mountains including Gråhøe to the north, Vassberget to the northeast, Sagtindan and Trolltinden to the east, and Bråkdalsbelgen and Smiukampen to the southeast.

See also
List of mountains of Norway by height

References

Sel
Mountains of Innlandet